Charles Scribner II (October 18, 1854 – April 19, 1930) was the president of Charles Scribner's Sons and a trustee at Skidmore College.

Early life
He was born in New York City on October 18, 1854. He was the son of Emma Elizabeth Blair (1827–1869) and Charles Scribner I.

Career
He joined his father's publishing company in 1875 after his Princeton graduation. When the other partners in the venture sold their stake to the family, the company was renamed Charles Scribner's Sons. In 1884, Scribner's younger brother, Arthur Hawley Scribner, joined Charles Scribner's Sons. The book publishing business was highly successful, and in 1886 Scribner's Magazine was relaunched. It too was a great success.

In 1889, Scribner was a founding member of the American Publishers Association. He was a trustee at Skidmore College.

Personal life
Scribner's brother-in-law, Ernest Flagg, was an architect and designed two Beaux-Arts buildings for the firm's New York headquarters.

He died on April 19, 1930.

Legacy
His summer house in Cornwall, New York, was later listed on the National Register of Historic Places.

References

External links

1854 births
1930 deaths
Charles Scribner's Sons
Princeton University alumni